Gort is the Irish name of the twelfth letter of the Ogham alphabet, ᚌ, meaning "field", which is related to Welsh garth 'garden' and Latin hortus. Its Proto-Indo-European root was *gher-, *ghort- 'to enclose, enclosure'. Its phonetic value is [ɡ].

Bríatharogam 
In the medieval kennings, called Bríatharogaim or Word Ogham the verses associated with gort are:

milsiu féraib - "sweetest grass" in the Bríatharogam Morann mic Moín

ined erc - "suitable place for cows"  in the Bríatharogam Mac ind Óc

sásad ile - "sating of multitudes"  in the Bríatharogam Con Culainn.

References

Ogham letters